Gorani  may refer to:

Places 
 , a village in the municipality of Skrad, Croatia
 Gorani, Konjic, a village in the municipality of Konjic, Bosnia and Herzegovina
 Gorani, Visoko, a village in the city of Visoko, Bosnia and Herzegovina
 Gorani, a village in Uda Commune, Argeș County, Romania
 Gorâni, a village in Odăile Commune, Buzău County, Romania
 Goranoi, a village in the municipal unit Faris, Laconia, Greece

People 

Gorani, Hala, French-American journalist, news anchor, war correspondent

Other uses 
 Gorani people, an ethnic group in the Balkans
 Gorani dialect, South Slavic language spoken by the Gorani people
 Zaza–Gorani languages, Indo-Iranian languages
 Gorani language, Western Iranian language
 Hala Gorani, CNN International anchorwoman
 Water deer (in Korean)

See also 
 Goran (disambiguation)
 Gurani (disambiguation)
 Gorane, a subgroup of the Toubou people of North Africa
 Gourané, a village in Ivory Coast